In social psychology, the boomerang effect, also known as "reactance", refers to the unintended consequences of an attempt to persuade resulting in the adoption of an opposing position instead. It is sometimes also referred to "the theory of psychological reactance", stating that attempts to restrict a person's freedom often produce an "anticonformity boomerang effect". In other words, the boomerang effect is a situation where people tend to pick the opposite of what something or someone is saying or doing because of how it is presented to them. Typically, the more aggressive something is presented, people would more than likely want to do the opposite. For example, if someone were to walk up to a yard with a sign saying "KEEP OFF LAWN" the person would be more likely to want to walk on the lawn because of the way they read the sign. If the sign read "please stay off my grass" people would be more likely to follow the directions.

Conditions and explanations

Early recognition

Hovland, Janis and Kelly first recorded and named the boomerang effect in 1953, noting that it is more likely under certain conditions:
 When weak arguments are paired with a negative source.
 When weak or unclear persuasion leads the recipient to believe that the communicator is propounding a different position to that which the communicator really intends.
 When the persuasion triggers aggression or unalleviated emotional arousal.
 When the communication adds to the recipient's knowledge of the norms and increases their conformity.
 When non-conformity to their own group results in feelings of guilt or social punishment.
 When the communicator's position is too far from the recipient's position and thus produces a "contrast" effect and thus enhances their original attitudes.

Later in 1957, Hovland, Sherif and Harvey further discussed the necessity of understanding these unintended attitude changes in persuasion communication and suggested possible approaches for analysis via underlying motivational processes, psychophysical stimuli, as well as ego-involving verbal material. Jack Brehm and Arthur Cohen were among the first to provide theoretical explanations.

Jack Brehm first raised attention to the phenomenon a fait accompli that might conceivably create dissonance if an event has led to the opposite behavior predicted at a prior point. He conducted an experiment to examine the behaviors of eighth graders eating a disliked vegetable. About half of them were told that their parents would be informed on the vegetable they ate. Then liking the vegetable was measured before and after the procedure. The results show that for kids who indicated little or no discrepancy between serving and actually eating the disliked vegetable at home, they should experience little or no dissonance in liking the vegetable from the low to the high consequence condition. They thereby concluded that the greater was the individual's initial dislike, the greater was the pressure produced by the experiment to increase his liking. In Jack Brehm's experiment it shows how even at a young age we are greatly impacted by the boomerang effect and it can have positive or negative outcomes that come with it. There was also larger resistance to change the attitude when the initial attitude was more extreme. However, they argued that in this experiment, the pressure to reduce dissonance increased more rapidly with increasing discrepancy than did the resistance against change, which verified Festinger's cognitive dissonance theory.
In a follow up, Sensenig and Brehm focused on the boomerang effect in experiments and applied Brehm's psychological reactance theory  to explain the unintended attitudinal change.

Psychological reactance theory analysis

Sensenig & Brehm applied Brehm's reactance theory to explain the boomerang effect. They argued that when a person thinks that his freedom to support a position on attitude issue is eliminated, the psychological reactance will be aroused and then he consequently moves his attitudinal position in a way so as to restore the lost freedom. He told college students to write an essay supporting one side of five issues and led some of them believe that their persuasive essays might influence the decision on those issues. Therefore, the people who had the impression that their preference was taken into account in the decision regarding which side they would support on the 1st issue showed attitude change in favor of the preferred position, while others who are concerned with their freedom lost move toward the intended position held by the communicator.

This experiment resulted in various links in the chain of reasoning: (a) when a person's freedom is threatened, his motivational state will move toward restoration of the threatened freedom; (b) the greater the implied threatened freedoms, the greater the tendency to restore the threatened freedom will be; (c) the reestablishment of freedom may take the form of moving one's attitudinal position away from the position forced by others.

Jack Brehm and Sharon Brehm later developed psychological reactance theory and discussed its applications. They also listed a series of reactions reactance can evoke in addition to the boomerang effect, which includes but is not limited to related boomerang effect, indirect restoration or vicarious boomerang effects.

Cognitive dissonance theory analysis

The dissonance theory by Leon Festinger has thrived the progress of social psychology research in the 1960s as it is not confined to the prediction of intended influence but can support almost all sub fields of psychology studies. Although Festinger himself was ambiguous about the role of commitment in the theory, later researchers such as Brehm and Cohen have emphasized its importance in providing a general conceptualization of the boomerang effect. Earlier studies by Thibaut and Strickland  and Kelley and Volkhart have also provided support to this line of reasoning by Dissonance Theory despite that they were not phrased using the exact terminology.

According to Cohen, dissonance theory can provide not only an explanation, but also a prediction of both the intended and the unintended influence of persuasion communication on attitudinal change. According to Saul McLeod, Cognitive dissonance refers to a situation involving conflicting attitudes, beliefs or behaviors. This produces a feeling of mental discomfort leading to an alteration in one of the attitudes, beliefs or behaviors to reduce the discomfort and restore balance. For example, when people smoke (behavior) and they know that smoking causes cancer (cognition), they are in a state of cognitive dissonance. Showing how the dissonance theory directly correlates to the boomerang effect has made impact on our knowledge of why humans act and can be influenced the way that they are.

In his experiment, he presented factors that can lead to a boomerang effect, while suggesting a broader view of the unintended consequences than simply the case of a response to attempted attitude change. Cohen proposed the following dissonance formulation model for the unintended attitude change by persuasive communication. First, suppose that dissonance aroused in regard to some unspecified cognition. According to Festinger's Cognitive Dissonance Theory, we know the dissonance could be reduced by a change in the cognition. Now suppose the resistance to change is great because the actual event cannot be changed and its meaning is ambiguous (for example, the person is strongly committed to the original cognition position), then the person will resort to other forms to reduce or eliminate the dissonance. In this latter form, one can solve the discrepancy problem through the addition of elements consonant either with the original cognition, in which produced the boomerang effect. Cohen formulated a situation of "mutual boomerang effect", in which the communicator is strongly committed to convince the other person of his attitudinal position by means of a persuasion communication. Because of this strong original attitude position the communicator holds, Cohen predicts that the more distant the target person's original attitude, the more dissonance will be also experienced by the communicator. The expected "unintended influence" arises when the communicator tried to persuade the other of the worth of his own position by becoming even more extreme in that position. He asked his subjects write a strongly persuasive essay to the partners with an opposite side of attitude on an issue, who are actually confederates. The subjects here thus act as the communicator to bring their partners over to their own sides. The subjects were also asked to rate the partners' likability and friendliness before they read "their partner's essay" returned. Cohen used attitude change of the partners as the manipulation of dissonance where he randomly allocated his subjects into high-dissonance group and low-dissonance group. The results exposed strong boomerang effects for high-dissonance group. He also found out that the response to the likability and friendliness of the partners are relevant. The data showed that the difference between dissonance conditions was largely confined to and exaggerated for those subjects who originally rated their partners to be relatively more likable and friendly.

Cohen's study on boomerang effect has broadened the scope of persuasive communication from merely the recipient's reaction to the persuasive message to the communicator's attempt to influence the target. Dissonance theory suggests that the basic issue is under what conditions a person strengthens his original attitude as a way of reducing some attitudinal inconsistency. Cohen suggested that, one can reduce the dissonance via boomerang when dissonance is created (a) with a strong commitment to convincing the other person, (b) with no anticipation of a further influence attempt, and (c) with no easy chance to repudiate the other person. His results on the likability have strengthened the interpretation as the low-dissonance group who found their partners likable and friendly move toward them in the attitudes more, while likability only increased dissonance for the highs.

In other words, the dissonance can be reduced by becoming more extreme in the original position, thereby increasing the proportion of cognition supporting the initial stand and decreasing the proportion of dissonant cognition.

Other analysis

Boomerang effect is sometimes also referred to the attribution/attitude boomerang effect. Researchers applied Heider's attribution theory to explain why it would occur. For example, Skowronski, Carlston, Mae, and Crawford demonstrated association-based effects in their study on spontaneous trait transference. Despite that the descriptions of other people are independent of the communicator, simple associative processes link the two together and produce boomerang phenomena.

Examples of applications

Consumer behavior

Wendlandt and Schrader studied the resistance of consumers against loyalty programs encountered in relationship marketing. They found that (a) contractual bonds provoke reactance effects, (b) social-psychological bonds increased neither reactance nor perceived utility of the program, (c) economic bonds raised perceived utility to a certain threshold level, from which the reactance effect dominated afterwards. Their results helped managers to evaluate the effects from implementing consumer retention measures and advised a cautious and limited application of loyalty programs. In 2017, a study was done to test the significance of the boomerang effect, Based on this 2×2 matrix we designed a pilot and three experimental studies that examine the different possible combinations. In the pilot study we tested several different biases and contexts to make sure that they are indeed perceived as socially sensitive by participants. In study 1 we replicated the results of Nasie et al. (2014), and demonstrated how teaching people about a neutral bias that might be relevant to their behavior in a neutral context changed their behavior and reduced the bias (combination #1). In Study 2 we taught decision makers about an inherently sensitive bias that may imply they were holding chauvinistic views in a sensitive social context, of female representation in politics (combination #4). Finally, to test if a sensitive social context is enough to evoke the boomerang effect even toward a neutral bias, in Study 3 we taught decision makers about a neutral bias in a sensitive social context of a gender in the work place (combination #3). In Studies 2 & 3, we hypothesized that the boomerang effect predicted by self-affirmation literature (Schumann & Dweck, 2014; Sherman & Cohen, 2006; Steele, 1988) would be a result of participants being motivated to justify their actions and stay set in their ways in order to avoid being labeled as chauvinistic or misogynistic. Since inherently sensitive biases are always linked to sensitive social contexts combination #2 was covered by Study 2 as well, and did not call for another Study. In the study they found that using the boomerang effect had a significantly positive outcome. This is an example on how some individuals were aware of the boomerang effect and some were not but both showed a positive result.

Deliberate exploitation

The tactic of reverse psychology, which is a deliberate exploitation of an anticipated boomerang effect, involves one's attempt of feigning a desire for an outcome opposite to that of the truly desired one, such that the prospect's resistance will work in the direction that the exploiter actually desires (e.g., "Please don't fling me in that briar patch").

Persuasive health communication

Researchers have reported that some public health interventions have produced effects opposite to those intended in health communication such as smoking and alcohol consumption behaviors, and thus have employed various methods to study them under different contexts. Ringold argued that some consumer's negative reactions on alcoholic beverage warnings and education efforts can be explained concisely by Brehm's psychological reactance theory. These results suggested that boomerang effects should be considered as potential costs of launching mass communication campaigns. Dillard and Shen also emphasized the importance of reactance theory to understand failures in persuasive health communication but argued that there be a measurement problem. They thereby developed four alternative conceptual perspectives on the nature of reactance as well as provided an empirical test of each. Hyland and Birrell  found that a government health warning on cigarette advertisements published in 1979 led to a "boomerang effect" leading to an increase desire to smoke after viewing the campaign. The results of their study indicated that the presence of a more aggressive health warning in an advertisement increased the desire to smoke and it decreased the perceived goodness of the advertisement. This means the people viewing the sign decided it was not a helpful campaign to decrease smoking. Another negative impact of this effect happens in drug and supplement marketing. Bolton et al.  researched how the marketing of health drugs and supplements lead to less healthy life style due to the drugs' marketing reducing risk perceptions and perceived importance of, and motivation to engage in, complementary health-protective behaviors. Consumers believe it is not important to have a healthy lifestyle if they use the drugs and supplements.

Environmental behaviors

Mann and Hill investigated the case of litter control and showed that the combination of different positive influence strategies could actually create boomerang effect and decrease the amount of appropriate disposal of waste.
Schultz et al. (2007) conducted a field experiment in which the normative messages were used to promote household energy conservation where they found the descriptive message of neighborhood usage created a boomerang effect depending on the high prior household consumption. They also eliminated the boomerang effect by adding an injunctive message about social approval. Their results offered an empirical evidence for prior research on the theoretical framework for boomerang effects. Swatuk et al. found a boomerang effect regarding a call of climate control action from locals after The Paris Agreement. The call was considered 'maladaptation' due to it calling for displacement of communities from traditional lands. They suggest careful articulation of policy and program decisions to improve policy making.

Helping

Schwartz and Howard discussed the occurrence of boomerang effects in helping as they found out the presence of certain factors presumed to activate norms favoring helping actually result in decreasing helping. They identified three related forms of such boomerang effect in helping behavior. First, when individuals perceived the framing of a help appeal to have excessive statements of need, they become suspicious and concern the motive and the true severity of the original request (i.e., mistrust). Reactance theory was used to provide the second explanation. They stated that individuals would respond to threatened freedoms by either acting counter to the attempted social influence, or declaring themselves helpless. The third type involves undermining internalized benefits by external sanctions.

National and human security

Liotta attempted to understand policy decisions and future choices driven by a blurring of concerns that involve state-centric security and human security. She suggested that a boomerang effect occurs in the area in which excessive focus on one aspect of security at the expense or detriment of the other is a poor balancing of ends and means in a changing security environment and instead we should focus on both national and human security.

Political beliefs

Nyhan & Reifler conducted experiments in which subjects read mock news articles including a misleading claim from a politician, or such a claim followed by a correction.  They found that the corrections frequently fail to reduce misconceptions for the ideological group targeted by the misinformation.  They also found cases of what they called a "backfire effect" (i.e. a boomerang effect) in which the corrections strengthened belief in the misinformation.  They attribute this to motivated reasoning on the part of the affected participants. Later research did not find evidence of this effect though, suggesting it was at least not prevalent.

Related effects

See also

References 

Persuasion
Cognitive biases